The women's 100m breaststroke events at the 2019 World Para Swimming Championships were held in the London Aquatics Centre at the Queen Elizabeth Olympic Park in London between 9–15 September.

Medalists

Results

SB4

SB5

SB6

SB7

SB8

SB9

SB11

SB12

SB13

SB14

References

2019 World Para Swimming Championships
2019 in women's swimming